A non-alcoholic mixed drink (also known as virgin cocktail, temperance drink, or mocktail) is a cocktail-style beverage made without alcoholic ingredients.

Also called "zero proof" drinks, the non-alcoholic drink dates back to the earliest days of the cocktail age, appearing as 'Temperance drinks' in the first American cocktail books, including Jerry Thomas's Bar-Tenders Guide (1862). Merriam-Webster cites the first mention of 'mocktail' as appearing in 1916. 

While the name of the non-alcoholic drink, as well as its style, has evolved over time, it is often a reflection of cocktail culture at large. The 1980s saw the resurgence of a 'mocktail' movement with often sugary drinks. Following the sophistication of cocktail culture of the 2000s, the zero proof drink also became more refined.

Mocktails, a portmanteau for "mock cocktails", are non-alcoholic drinks. The word "mock" implies a facade of the alcoholic cocktail without any of the alcoholic content. In the 2000s, it became popular enough to find its place on cocktail menus in many restaurants and bars, especially temperance bars. According to Mintel, alcohol-free mixed drinks grew 35% as a beverage type on the menus of bars and restaurants from 2016 to 2019 in the US. In 2019, "The Providence Journal" reported that there were at least 4 bars in New York City that served mocktails only.

Zero proof drinks can be made in the style of classic cocktails, like a non-alcoholic gimlet, or can represent a new style of drink altogether. The popularity of drinking abstinence programs like Dry January, coinciding with the rise of the health and wellness culture has pushed non-alcoholic drinks to wider acceptance. Like the vegetarian food movement or the popularity of oat milk, zero proof drinks are now seen as valid choices for all types of drinkers.

List of non-alcoholic cocktails

Arnold Palmer
Freddie Bartholomew
Gunner
Lemon, lime and bitters
Roy Rogers
Tortuga
Virgin Mary
Virgin colada

Others
 Basil Lemonade – from Oscar's Steakhouse at Plaza Hotel & Casino in Las Vegas, Nevada, contains basil simple syrup and sweet and sour.
 Faux margarita – a mix of spicy jalapeño and pineapple.
 Keep Sober – from The Underground Speakeasy at Mob Museum in Las Vegas, Nevada, contains grenadine, lemon, and elderflower tonic.
 Molossolini – Molossian signature soft drink, mixed drink with Sprite, grenadine, and pineapple juice. With cherries added and slices of banana, orange, and pineapple.
 Rosemary grapefruit fizz – from The Underground Speakeasy at Mob Museum in Las Vegas, Nevada, contains grapefruit, rosemary, and tonic.
 Strawberry Refresher – from Oscar's Steakhouse at Plaza Hotel & Casino in Las Vegas, Nevada, contains strawberry puree, lime juice, and Sprite.

List of traditional non-alcoholic drinks

 Aam panna
 Aguas frescas
 Aguapanela
 Almdudler
 Apfelschorle
 Atole
 Babycino
 Baesuk
 Bandrek
 Bandung
 Barley water
 Birch sap
 Blåbärssoppa
 Bread Drink
 Cendol
 Chalap
 Champurrado
 Champús
 Chass
 Chicha morada
 Cholado
 Chai
 Cola
 Coffee
 Doogh
 Egg cream
 Egg nog
 Elderflower cordial
 Es bir
 Falooda
 Garapa
 Ginger ale
 Ginger tea
 Hawaiian Punch
 Horchata
 Hot chocolate
 Hwachae
 Janda pulang
 Jindallae hwachae
 Kefir
 Kombucha
 Kvass
 Lassi
 Lemonade
 Licuado
 Mattha
 Mazamorra
 Milk
 Milkshake
 Mocochinchi
 Mote con huesillo
 Nectar
 Orange drink
 Orange soft drink
 Peanut milk
 Peanut punch
 Roasted barley tea
 Root beer
 Sarsaparilla
 Sharbat
 Shikanjvi
 Shirley Temple (drink)
 Smoothie
 Squash (drink)
 Subak hwachae
 Sujeonggwa
 Switchel
 Tea
 Tereré
 Thadal
 Water
 Yerba Mate
 Yuja hwachae

List of branded non-alcoholic drinks

 Accelerade
 Bonjus
 Bovril (Drink)
 Burple
 Claytons
 Coolatta
 Crodino
 Crystal Light
 Easy Mixers Cocktail
 Enviga
 Froster
 Gatorade
 Harar Sofi
 Hoppy
 Hi-C
 Kellogg's Special K2O Protein Water
 Kool-Aid
 Lipton Brisk
 Matte Leão
 Milo
 Nestea
 Nutrimato
 Orange Whip
 Powerade
 Propel Fitness Water
 RAC 124
 Rooh Afza
 Sangria Señorial
 Shloer
 Slow Cow
 Slurpee
 Slush Puppie
 Staminade
 Sustagen
 SunnyD
 Tang
 Thirst Buster
 Yoo-hoo

See also
 Health shake
 Punch
 Soft drink
 
 Temperance bar

References

Mixed drinks
Mixed
Food- and drink-related lists
Lists of drinks